Tanzi is a surname. Notable people with the surname include:

Calisto Tanzi (1938–2022), Italian businessman and criminal
Lia Tanzi (born 1948), Italian actress
Rudolph E. Tanzi, American professor
Teresa Tanzi (born 1971), American politician

See also

 Tanzi (disambiguation)